John Crofton Hawksworth (born December 1963) is the chief economist for PriceWaterhouseCoopers in the United Kingdom.

Early life
John Hawksworth was born in Brighton, England, in December 1963 to Robert Marshall Hawksworth and Norah Connor Hawksworth née Crofton. He was baptised at St Saviour's Church of England church in Pimlico, London, in 1964.

Career
Hawksworth is the chief economist for PriceWaterhouseCoopers in the United Kingdom. He specialises in global macroeconomics and public policy issues, and is the editor of PWC's Economic Outlook and World in 2050 series of reports. He has worked with the Institute for Public Policy Research and the Social Market Foundation.

Personal life
Hawksworth is a chess player who has taken part in a number of tournaments.  He has a FIDE rating of 2355 and has been awarded the title of International Master.

Selected publications
Challenging the conventions. Public borrowing rules and housing investment: A report for the Chartered Institute of Housing. Chartered Institute of Housing, 1995. 
Review of research relevant to assessing the impact of the proposed National Pension Savings Scheme on household savings. 2006.

See also
Andrew Sentance

References

External links 
Articles by John Hawksworth.
John Hawksworth talking on Our World in 2050.

PricewaterhouseCoopers people
Living people
People from Brighton
1963 births
English chess players
Chess International Masters
English economists